American Recording Productions was founded by Armenian musician Ara Topouzian in 1991. Over thirty recordings have been produced by ARP and continue to be produced. Distributed throughout the world, ARP specializes in traditional music of Armenia, Greece, and the Middle East.

See also
List of record labels

External links
 Official website

American record labels
Record labels established in 1991
World music record labels
1991 establishments in the United States